Jacqueline Andrée Pagnol (née Bouvier; 6 October 1920 – 22 August 2016) was a French actress. She acted in many French films in the 1940s and 1950s. She was the wife of French author and filmmaker Marcel Pagnol.

Biography

Early life
Jacqueline Bouvier was born on 6 October 1920. She grew up tending her aunt's goats in Camargue. She studied drama.

Career
She acted in many French films, six of which were directed by her husband. She has revealed that the main character in Manon des sources was based on her own childhood. She owned the copyright of Marcel Pagnol's work and approved all film adaptations.

Personal life
She met author and filmmaker Marcel Pagnol when she was twenty-three years old. They resided at Avenue Foch in Paris.

Filmography
La maison des sept jeunes filles (1942).
Les ailes blanches (1943).
 Goodbye Leonard (1943).
 Night Shift (1944).
Nais (1945).
 The Pretty Miller Girl (1949).
 The Prize (1950).
Topaze (1951).
Adhemar ou le jouet de la fatalite (1951).
Manon des sources (1952).
Carnaval (1953).
 The Terror with Women (1956).

References

1920 births
2016 deaths
People from Gard
French film actresses